Tim Abell (born July 1, 1958 in Manassas, Virginia) is an American actor, and former Army Ranger. He has appeared in over fifty movies and TV shows, including Desert Thunder (1998), The Substitute: Failure Is Not an Option (2001), Curse of the Komodo (2004), Super Shark (2011), and Sniper: Special Ops (2016). His most famous role was as Benny Ray Riddle in the action-adventure television series Soldier of Fortune, Inc. (1997–1998) created by Dan Gordon. Many of his movies have been directed or headed by Fred Olen Ray and Jim Wynorski.

Biography 
Abell grew up in Maryland and Virginia. As a young boy, he participated in martial arts and boxing. At the age of 17, he joined the United States Army and eventually served in the Army Rangers. While at Fort Benning, he completed Advanced Infantry Training, Airborne School, and Ranger School. He was assigned to the 2nd Ranger Battalion. At the end of his military career he served in the 3rd US infantry "The Old Guard", Caisson Platoon. After five years in the Rangers, he was honorably discharged. Abell began training at the Arthur Murray Dance Studio, where he started performing in theatre. He has been in a second marriage with actress and producer Georgia Lambron.

Filmography

Film

Television

Voice acting
Tim has also done voice acting for various productions including Greenland, Bright, Suicide Squad, Fury, Olympus Has Fallen, White House Down, The Good Wife, Warm Bodies, and Zero Dark Thirty.

References

External links

 
 

Living people
1958 births
20th-century American male actors
Film producers from Virginia
American male film actors
American male television actors
21st-century American male actors
People from Manassas, Virginia
Male actors from Virginia
 United States Army soldiers